Jelonek may refer to the following places:
Jelonek, Gniezno County in Greater Poland Voivodeship (west-central Poland)
Jelonek, Lipsko County in Masovian Voivodeship (east-central Poland)
Jelonek, Przysucha County in Masovian Voivodeship (east-central Poland)
Jelonek, Krotoszyn County in Greater Poland Voivodeship (west-central Poland)
Jelonek, Warmian-Masurian Voivodeship (north Poland)
Jelonek, West Pomeranian Voivodeship (north-west Poland)
Michał Jelonek - Polish violinist
Jelonek (album) - first solo album of violinist Michał Jelonek